William Burris Powell (May 8, 1885  September 28, 1967) was a pitcher in Major League Baseball. He played for the Pittsburgh Pirates, Chicago Cubs, and Cincinnati Reds.

References

External links 

 

1885 births
1967 deaths
Major League Baseball pitchers
Pittsburgh Pirates players
Chicago Cubs players
Cincinnati Reds players
Baseball players from West Virginia
People from Taylor County, West Virginia
Springfield Ponies players
Kansas City Blues (baseball) players
Milwaukee Brewers (minor league) players
Little Rock Travelers players